The fork-tailed drongo-cuckoo (Surniculus dicruroides) is a species of cuckoo that resembles a black drongo. It is found resident mainly in peninsular India in hill forests although some specimens are known from the Himalayan foothills. It can be easily distinguished by its straight beak and the white barred vent. It has a deeply forked tail often having a white spot on the back of the head. The song has been described as a series of 5 or 6 whistling "pip-pip-pip-pip-pip-" notes rising in pitch with each "pip".

It is a brood parasite on small babblers. It is not known how or whether the drongo-like appearance benefits this species but it is suspected that it aids in brood-parasitism just as hawk-cuckoos appear like hawks.

The species was described by Brian Hodgson from Nepal as Pseudornis dicruroides. It was later placed as a subspecies of Surniculus lugubris. In 2005 it was suggested that the species was should be split from the more narrowly defined square-tailed drongo-cuckoo Surniculus lugubris due to morphological and call differences.

References

fork-tailed drongo-cuckoo
Birds of South China
Birds of Hainan
Birds of the Himalayas
Birds of South Asia
fork-tailed drongo-cuckoo
fork-tailed drongo-cuckoo